Semproniano is a comune (municipality) in the Province of Grosseto in the Italian region of Tuscany, about  south of Florence and about  east of Grosseto.

Semproniano borders the following municipalities: Castell'Azzara, Manciano, Roccalbegna, Santa Fiora, Sorano.

Frazioni 
The municipality consists of the municipal seat of Semproniano and the villages of (frazioni) of Catabbio, Cellena, Petricci and Rocchette di Fazio.

Government

List of mayors

Main sights
The medieval Palazzo Civico and Palazzo dei Vicari Mediceo
Church of Santa Croce, faced by the remains of the Aldobrandeschi castle (Rocca).
The 12th century (renamed in the 16th century) Pieve dei Santi Vincenzo e Anastasio.
Castle of Catabbio, built in the 12th century by the Aldobrandeschi and later used by the Orsini of Pitigliano
Medieval burgh of Rocchette di Fazio.

References

External links

 Official website